Caleb Bostic (born August 25, 1988) is an American football linebacker who is currently a free agent. He played college football at Miami University.

Professional career

Cincinnati Bengals
Bostic was invited to attend mini camp with the Cincinnati Bengals in April 2010, Bostic never signed a free agent contract.

Cincinnati Commandos
In June 2010, Bostic signed with the Cincinnati Commandos, an indoor football team who played in the Continental Indoor Football League. Bostic joined the Commandos for their two playoffs games, starting both, helping the Commandos win the CIFL Championship Game in their first year of existence.

Pittsburgh Power
In December 2010, Bostic was assigned to the Pittsburgh Power. After only playing in two games, he was released on May 6, 2011.

Georgia Force
Bostic didn't remain a free agent very long, as he signed with the Georgia Force on May 11, 2011. He has re-signed with the Force for the 2012 season.

Alabama Hammers
Bostic played for the Alabama Hammers during their 2013 championship season, and during the 2014 season.

Philadelphia Soul
On February 26, 2015, Bostic was assigned to the Philadelphia Soul of the AFL.

New Orleans VooDoo
On May 11, 2015, Bostic was traded to the New Orleans VooDoo for Daverin Geralds.

References

External links
 Miami Ohio bio 
 Georgia Force bio

1988 births
Living people
American football linebackers
Miami RedHawks football players
Georgia Force players
Pittsburgh Power players
Cincinnati Commandos players
Texas Revolution players
Alabama Hammers players
Philadelphia Soul players
New Orleans VooDoo players
Players of American football from Columbus, Ohio
Players of Canadian football from Columbus, Ohio